Ji Xiangzheng (born 4 July 1997) is a Chinese professional footballer player who is currently a free agent.

Club career
Ji Xiangzheng would play for the Guangzhou R&F youth team before being sent out to the clubs satellite team, R&F. He would eventually go on to make his debut for the club on 1 March 2019 in the Hong Kong Sapling Cup against Tai Po FC in a game that ended in a 3-1 victory. The following season Ji would join another Hong Kong Premier League in Rangers on loan and would make his debut for them in a league game on 24 November 2019 in a 3-2 defeat to Tai Po FC.

Career statistics

Notes

References

External links
 

Living people
1997 births
Chinese footballers
Chinese expatriate footballers
Association football goalkeepers
Hong Kong Premier League players
R&F (Hong Kong) players
Hong Kong Rangers FC players
Expatriate footballers in Hong Kong
Chinese expatriate sportspeople in Hong Kong